Joe Hanly (5 May 1925 – 6 August 1996) was an Irish rower. He competed in the men's eight event at the 1948 Summer Olympics. The Hanly Medal, awarded by the Old Collegians Boat Club, was named after him.

References

External links
 

1925 births
1996 deaths
Irish male rowers
Olympic rowers of Ireland
Rowers at the 1948 Summer Olympics
Place of birth missing
20th-century Irish people